Isoptericola halotolerans is a Gram-positive, moderately halophilic and non-motile bacterium from the genus Isoptericola which has been isolated from soil in Qinghai Province, China.

References

Further reading

External links
Type strain of Isoptericola halotolerans at BacDive -  the Bacterial Diversity Metadatabase

Micrococcales
Bacteria described in 2005
Halophiles